MPM Motors was a French car manufacturer founded in September 2015. The first and only model of the manufacturer is the MPM Erelis (the evolution of the Tagaz Aquila/PS160, formerly produced by TagAZ in Russia), was approved for Europe in December 2016.

History 

In 2015, the start-up MPM Motors was created in France, in Croissy-sur-Seine, by Oleg and Igor Paramonov, the sons of the industrialist Michael Paramonov who grew up in France, they decided to launch the brand there (in tribute to their father; Mr. Paramonov Manufacturing is MPM).

The start-up to get started developing from the "Aquila" model, a project left fallow pending the demise of TagAZ and which had never had the means of its potential. The Aquila was originally developed in South Korea with a start of production in Russia, the project had been abandoned after the fall of the industrial group to which it belonged, Doninvest.

The adventure becomes concrete with the opening of the entirely manual production chain in the Saint Quentin en Yvelines agglomeration. in January 2016, thus allowing the creation of many jobs in the region.

Originally named "PS160", MPM renamed its coupé "Erelis" in August 2018 adopting the PSA 3-cylinder 1.2- liter turbocharged engine with 130 hp. The manufacturer exhibited the Erelis during Les Grandes Heures Automobiles in September 2018.

In March of 2021 MPM Motors filed for bankruptcy.

MPM Cup

MPM Motors is preparing a championship dedicated to MPM models. The MPM Cup takes place on French circuits from 2019.

Products

The only current product is the MPM Erelis.

MPM was developing an SUV named Vultur which was 95% complete at the time the company filed for bankruptcy.

Notes

External links

 Official site
 MPM Cup official site

French brands
Car brands
French companies established in 2015
Vehicle manufacturing companies established in 2015
French companies disestablished in 2021
Vehicle manufacturing companies disestablished in 2021
Luxury motor vehicle manufacturers
2015 establishments in France
2021 disestablishments in France
Car manufacturers
Car manufacturers of France